Rudolph I, Count Palatine of Tübingen (1160 – 17 March 1219) was the eldest son of Count Palatine Hugo II of Tübingen.  Around 1183, he founded the Premonstratensian Bebenhausen Abbey as a burial place for his family.

He married Matilda, Countess of Gleiberg and heir of Giessen (d. 1206). They had three sons.
 Rudolph II ( – 1 November 1247), inherited Horb, Herrenberg and Tübingen.
 Hugo V ( – 26 July 1216)
 William, Count of Asperg-Giessen ( – )

Footnotes 

Founders of Catholic religious communities
Counts Palatine of the Holy Roman Empire
1160 births
1219 deaths
12th-century German nobility
12th-century rulers in Europe